The Palaung State Liberation Front (abbreviated PSLF) is a political organization in Myanmar. Its armed wing, the Ta’ang National Liberation Army (TNLA), has around 6,000 members.

History
The Palaung National Front (PNF) was founded on 12 January 1963 by national leaders from different parts of Shan state. On 12 January 1976 Mai Kwan Toung, one of the military commanders of the PNF who had allied himself with the Kachin Independence Army (KIA), set up the Palaung State Liberation Organization (PSLO) and its armed wing, the Palaung State Liberation Army (PSLA).

On 27 April 1991, the PSLO and PSLA concluded a ceasefire agreement with the SLORC. However, some members of the party, dissatisfied with the cease-fire and refusal to reach an acceptable political settlement, formed the Palaung State Liberation Front (PSLF) on 12 January 1992 at the headquarters of the Karen National Union in Manerplaw, under the leadership of Mai Tin Moung.

References

Rebel groups in Myanmar